Mark Turner (born 4 October 1972) is a former English footballer, born in Bebington, Cheshire, who played in the Football League for Wolverhampton Wanderers, Northampton Town and Hereford United. He played  as a defender or midfielder. He joined Conference North side Tamworth for the second time in 2007.

He started his career with Paget Rangers in the West Midlands Regional League. He then joined Wolverhampton Wanderers in 1991 where he played under his father, Graham Turner, making a single league appearance in three seasons. A season at Northampton Town followed before he joined Conference side Telford United. In 1996, he played six league matches for Hereford United after his father Graham signed him on transfer deadline day, to bolster his relegation-threatened side. Hereford were ultimately relegated to the Conference and Mark returned to Telford for a second season.

After a two-season spell with King's Lynn he joined Tamworth for the first time, playing under Gary Mills, whom he would also play under at Alfreton Town and on his return to Tamworth for the 2007–08 season.

References

1972 births
Living people
People from Bebington
English footballers
Wolverhampton Wanderers F.C. players
Northampton Town F.C. players
Telford United F.C. players
Hereford United F.C. players
King's Lynn F.C. players
Tamworth F.C. players
Alfreton Town F.C. players
Solihull Borough F.C. players
English Football League players
National League (English football) players
Paget Rangers F.C. players
Association football defenders
Association football midfielders